Dener is a male given name. It may refer to:
 Dener (footballer, 1971-1994), Dener Augusto de Sousa, Brazilian football forward
 Dener Jaanimaa (born 1989), Estonian handball player
 Dener (footballer, 1991-2016), Dener Assunção Braz, Brazilian football left-back
 Dener (footballer, born 1992), Dener Gomes Clemente, Brazilian football attacking midfielder
 Dener (footballer, born 1995), Dener Gonçalves Pinheiro, Brazilian football midfielder